The Rees Baronetcy, of Aylwards Chase in the County of Middlesex, was a title in the Baronetage of the United Kingdom. It was created on 8 May 1919 for Sir J. D. Rees, in honour of parliamentary and public services. He was succeeded by his son, the second Baronet. He was a diplomat, writer and painter. The title became extinct on his death in 1970.

Rees baronets, of Aylwards Chase (1919)
Sir John David Rees, 1st Baronet (1854–1922)
Sir Richard Lodowick Edward Montagu Rees, 2nd Baronet (1900–1970)

Arms

References

Extinct baronetcies in the Baronetage of the United Kingdom